Naarda blepharota is a type of moth in the family Noctuidae first described by Strand in 1920.

References

Herminiinae
Moths described in 1920